Manea is a Romanian surname of Turkish origin, derived from mâni, a form of folk song. Notable persons with the name Manea include:

Persons with the given name
Manea Khadoum (born 1994), Emirati footballer
Manea Mănescu (1916–2009), Romanian politician
Manea Mohammed (born 1989), Emirati footballer

Persons with the surname
Alin Manea (born 1997), Romanian footballer
Cristian Manea (born 1997), Romanian football player
Elham Manea (born 1966), Privatdozentin
Ern Manea (1926–2013), Australian mayor
Mohammed Al Manea (born 1930), Kuwaiti actor
Nicolae Manea (1954–2014), Romanian football player and coach
Norman Manea (born 1936), Romanian writer
Oana Manea (born 1985), Romanian handball player
Rareș Manea (born 1986), Romanian athlete
Silviu Manea (born 1983), Romanian athlete

Romanian-language surnames
Romanian masculine given names